Edwina Brocklesby is the founder and director of Silverfit, a charity dedicated to the promotion of the health benefits of physical activity for older people. and triathlete.

Eddie started running at age 50 and at the age of 74 became the oldest British woman to complete an Ironman triathlon.

Born in 1943 Edwina was a social worker for 50 years, educated at the University of Nottingham with a bachelor's degree in Economics and them the University of Leicester in 1963 with a PhD relating to Adoption and Contact in 2009.

Now based in Surrey, Edwina is a mother of three and grandmother of four. She has spent the last twenty years taking part in marathons, triathlons and Ironman races across the globe, has represented GB in many European and World triathlon and duathlon championships, cycled in a 4-person relay of over 3000 miles across America (Race Across AMerica) and completed five further Ironman triathlons

Brocklesby founded Silverfit in 2013, a charity devoted to increasing physical activity and social inclusion for older people – having fun. It has gone from strength to strength and is now a success in 17 venues across 9 London boroughs.

In April 2018 Brocklesby became a published author with the release of her autobiography, Irongran; leading to a wide range of TV, Radio, national and local newspapers and multiple magazines.

References

External links
 https://www.ageofnoretirement.org/stories/edwinabrocklesbyirongran
 https://www.theguardian.com/lifeandstyle/2018/sep/22/75-year-old-triathlete-balance
 https://www.swimserpentine.co.uk/news-media/latest-news/running-riding-swimming-classic-exercise-for-eddie-brocklesby/

1952 births
Living people
2013 establishments in England